"Hold My Hand" is the debut single of the American alternative rock band Hootie & the Blowfish from their album Cracked Rear View. All four of the band members (Mark Bryan, Dean Felber, Darius Rucker and Jim Sonefeld) wrote the song sometime in 1989, and it was released on a self-titled cassette EP the year after. Released in July 1994, "Hold My Hand" charted at number ten on the US Billboard Hot 100. The song includes a backing vocal from David Crosby.

Critical reception
Stephen Thomas Erlewine said that the song "has a singalong chorus that epitomizes the band's good-times vibes."

Chart performance
"Hold My Hand" peaked at number ten on the US Billboard Hot 100 and number six on Billboard Hot Adult Contemporary Tracks chart. It ended the year at number 22 on the Billboard Year-end Hot 100 singles chart for 1995.

Music video
The music video was directed by Adolfo Doring.

Charts

Weekly charts

Year-end charts

References

1989 songs
1994 debut singles
Hootie & the Blowfish songs
Songs written by Darius Rucker
Songs written by Jim Sonefeld
Songs written by Mark Bryan
Song recordings produced by Don Gehman
Atlantic Records singles
Pop ballads
1980s ballads
Alternative rock ballads